Spent: Sex, Evolution, and Consumer Behavior is a 2009 book by Geoffrey Miller.

The book presents an evolutionary analysis of marketing, arguing that consumers seek pleasure and seek to display favorable traits to others.

References

2009 non-fiction books
Psychology books